The Retriever Soccer Park is one of the University of Maryland, Baltimore County's athletic fields. It is located in the southeastern section of the campus next to the UMBC Stadium, the Department of Facilities Management, and bordered by Shelbourne Road in Arbutus, Maryland. The stadium was completed in the fall of 1998 and included a 120-yard by 70-yard field, press box, automated electronic scoreboard display, and concessions area. 

The field was renovated in 2006 with permanent bleachers have been added to seat 1,500 spectators as well as the Bermuda grass and irrigation system installations. The Retriever Soccer Park can be accessed off of Hilltop Circle by Stadium Road, and is served by the Stadium Lot (formerly Lot 17), which can hold 900 vehicles.

See also
 UMBC Retrievers

References

External links
 Retriever Soccer Park

UMBC Retrievers soccer
Soccer venues in Maryland
1998 establishments in Maryland
Sports venues completed in 1998
College soccer venues in the United States